On 7 July 2021 Indian Prime Minister Narendra Modi carried out a reshuffle of his ministry.

Background 
Modi carried out 3 cabinet reshuffles during his first ministry. The cabinet reshuffle of 2021 is the first cabinet reshuffle of the second Modi ministry.

Changes 
Jyotiraditya Scindia, Narayan Rane, Sarbananda Sonowal, Anupriya Patel, Kapil Patil, Meenakshi Lekhi, Ajay Bhatt, Bhupender Yadav, Darshana Jardosh, Pashupati Kumar Paras, Ramchandra Prasad Singh, Bharati Pawar, Ashwini Vaishnaw, Nisith Pramanik, Shobha Karandlaje, Pratima Bhoumik, L. Murugan, Ajay Kumar Mishra, Pankaj Chaudhary, Kaushal Kishore, Rajeev Chandrasekhar, Subhas Sarkar, Shantanu Thakur, Rajkumar Ranjan Singh, Bhanu Pratap Singh Verma, S. P. Singh Baghel, Annapurna Devi Yadav,  B. L. Verma, Devusinh Chauhan, Bhagwanth Khuba, Mahendra Munjapara, John Barla, Bishweswar Tudu and A. Narayanaswamy became new ministers.

Harsh Vardhan, Prakash Javadekar, Ravi Shankar Prasad, Ramesh Pokhriyal Nishank, D. V. Sadananda Gowda, Santosh Gangwar, Sanjay Dhotre, Debasree Chaudhuri, Rattan Lal Kataria, Babul Supriyo, Thawarchand Gehlot and Pratap Sarangi left the Modi cabinet.

Anurag Thakur, G. Kishan Reddy, Kiren Rijiju, R. K. Singh, Hardeep Singh Puri, Mansukh L. Mandaviya and Parshottam Rupala were promoted to cabinet rank ministers.

See also 

 Premiership of Narendra Modi
 Second Modi ministry

References 

Narendra Modi
July 2021 events in India
Cabinet reshuffles in India